Deborah Margaret Ryland Coyne (born February 24, 1955) is a Canadian constitutional lawyer, professor, and author. She is the cousin of journalist Andrew Coyne and actress Susan Coyne, and the niece of former Bank of Canada governor James Elliott Coyne.

Biography
Coyne grew up in Ottawa. She graduated from Queen's University with a degree in economics and history in 1976. She received a Bachelor of Laws degree from Osgoode Hall Law School of York University in 1979 and a Master of Philosophy from University of Oxford in international relations in 1982.

She was an employee in the Prime Minister's Office of John Turner, before spending two years teaching constitutional law at the University of Toronto Law School; she has also worked for the Business Council on National Issues, the Ontario Health Service Appeal and Review Board, and the Immigration and Refugee Board of Canada.

For years, Coyne dated former Prime Minister Pierre Trudeau.  Her daughter, Sarah Elisabeth Coyne, is Trudeau's only daughter,  and was enrolled in the Wharton School of the University of Pennsylvania. Her second child, Matthew Coyne, is the son of Canadian journalist Michael Valpy. Valpy and Coyne have since divorced.

Deborah Coyne now lives in Toronto.

Political involvement

Opposition to the Meech Lake and Charlottetown Accords
Deborah Coyne took a role in opposing the Meech Lake Accord, a comprehensive package of constitutional amendments designed to gain the province of Quebec's formal acceptance of the Constitution Act, 1982. Coyne was among many prominent Liberals who disagreed with the Accord, including Pierre Elliott Trudeau, Donald Johnston and Jean Chrétien, although the issue split the federal Liberal caucus. She was a founding member of the Canadian Coalition on the Constitution, a grass-roots group that opposed the agreement. From 1989 to 1991, Coyne served as constitutional advisor to Newfoundland Premier Clyde Wells. Among the premiers, Wells was the staunchest opponent of the Meech Lake Constitutional Accord. Following the death of the Accord, partly at the hands of the Newfoundland House of Assembly, she opposed the Charlottetown Accord, a subsequent attempt to amend the Canadian constitution. The Charlottetown agreement was submitted to a national referendum in 1992 and was ultimately rejected by a majority of Canadian voters. Coyne led one of the "No" committees in the campaign and spoke widely against the deal.

Liberal candidate
Until the 2006 federal election was called, she was a member of the Immigration and Refugee Board of Canada. In that election, she ran in the electoral district of Toronto—Danforth as a Liberal Party candidate against New Democratic Party leader Jack Layton. Coyne finished second to Layton with 17,256 votes, or 34.2%.

Coyne was nominated in March 2007 as the Liberal Party of Canada candidate in Toronto Danforth but withdrew later in the year. In 2008, she sought the federal Liberal nomination in the riding of Don Valley West but withdrew in favour of Rob Oliphant.

Liberal leadership campaign
On June 27, 2012, Coyne announced that she would be a candidate for leader of the Liberal Party of Canada, during the Party's 2013 leadership contest, which was won ultimately by Justin Trudeau. Her campaign was managed by blogger Jeff Jedras.

Following the leadership campaign, Coyne made an unsuccessful bid for the Liberal Party of Canada's nomination in Ottawa West—Nepean in 2014.

Move to the Green Party

On February 26, 2015, Green Party of Canada Leader Elizabeth May announced that Coyne had been appointed as a senior policy advisor, noting "Deborah's thoughtful approach to One Canada for all Canadians complements the vision of the Green Party of Canada." Coyne was the  Green Party of Canada candidate in the Ottawa riding of Carleton for the 2015 federal election, where she finished fourth with just over 3% of the vote.

Since the 2015 federal election, Coyne has stepped away from partisan politics and no longer holds a membership in any political party.

Electoral record

Published works

References

External links 
 deborahcoyne.ca
 Canadians Without Borders

1955 births
Alumni of the University of Oxford
Canadian women in federal politics
20th-century Canadian women writers
Deborah
Immigration and Refugee Board of Canada
Lawyers in Ontario
Candidates in the 2006 Canadian federal election
Living people
Ontario candidates for Member of Parliament
Osgoode Hall Law School alumni
Politicians from Ottawa
Trudeau political family
Academic staff of the University of Toronto Faculty of Law
Women in Ontario politics
Canadian women lawyers
Canadian women academics
Canadian scholars of constitutional law
Queen's University at Kingston alumni
Writers from Ottawa
20th-century Canadian non-fiction writers
21st-century Canadian non-fiction writers
21st-century Canadian women writers
21st-century Canadian women politicians
Liberal Party of Canada candidates for the Canadian House of Commons
Canadian women non-fiction writers
Women legal scholars